South Valley is a census-designated place (CDP) and town in Bernalillo County, New Mexico, United States. The population was 40,976 at the 2010 Census. It is part of the Albuquerque Metropolitan Statistical Area. The U.S. Postal Service uses "Albuquerque" for all South Valley addresses (ZIP code 87105).

Geography and environment

It is bordered on the north, east, and half of its west side by the city of Albuquerque. The Rio Grande runs north to south through the center of the CDP.
    

Municipal wells San Jose number 3 and San Jose number 6 were decommissioned in 1981 due to contamination with low levels of organic solvents, halocarbons and aromatics. These wells were plugged and abandoned in September 1994. The site remains on the Superfund site list with on-going remedial actions to contain, capture and reduce the concentration of the contaminant plume within the ground water.

Demographics

As of the census of 2000, there were 40,976 people, 13,802 households, and 10,087 families residing in the CDP. The population density was 1,362.2 people per square mile (523.7/km). There were 14,784 housing units at an average density of 491.2 per square mile (189.8/km). The racial makeup of the CDP was 59.5% White, 1.2% African American, 2.2% Native American, 0.4% Asian, 0.0% Pacific Islander, 32.7% from other races, and 4.0% from two or more races. Hispanic or Latino of any race were 80.2% of the population.

There were 13,802 households, out of which 31.8% had children under the age of 18 living with them, 46.1% were married couples living together, 17.8% had a female householder with no husband present, 9.2% were a male householder with no wife present, and 26.9% were non-families. 21.6% of all households were made up of individuals, and 7.5% had someone living alone who was 65 years of age or older. The average household size was 2.93 and the average family size was 3.4.

In the CDP, the population was spread out, with 26.8% under the age of 18, 6.9% from 20 to 24, 24.9% from 25 to 44, 21.4% from 45 to 64, and 12.3% who were 65 years of age or older. The median age was 35.5 years. For every 100 females, there were 98.8 males. For every 100 females age 18 and over, there were 97.7 males.

The median income for a household in the CDP was $36,821, and the median income for a family was $32,833. Males had a median income of $25,560 versus $21,973 for females. The per capita income for the CDP was $17,045. About 17.4% of families and 25.9% of the population were below the poverty line, including 29.2% of those under age 18 and 17.9% of those age 65 or over.

Incorporation efforts
Presently, the South Valley is an unincorporated area in Bernalillo County that lies south of the city limits of Albuquerque. In January 2010, a special election was held in the South Valley to decide whether or not the region should incorporate into a city, to be named Valle de Atrisco. Voters in the South Valley overwhelmingly rejected incorporation by a 93 to 7 percent margin during the special election on January 5, 2010. Opponents to incorporation cited the potential costs (and tax burden for residents) for providing for education, public works, police and fire services in the South Valley because Bernalillo County would no longer be providing these services to the community following incorporation.

Education
It is zoned to Albuquerque Public Schools.

Rio Grande High School is in South Valley.

In media
South Valley has been used as a filming location for the television series Breaking Bad and In Plain Sight.

References

Census-designated places in Bernalillo County, New Mexico
Census-designated places in New Mexico
Albuquerque metropolitan area
Superfund sites in New Mexico
Mexican-American culture in Albuquerque, New Mexico